Seyyed Abolhasan Haerizadeh (1894–1987) was an Iranian judge and politician. He was a member of Parliament of Iran for three consecutive terms between 1921 and 1928 and another four consecutive terms from 1947 to 1956.

Political affiliation 
Haerizadeh was an opponent of Reza Shah in the fourth, fifth and sixth parliamentary terms.  He was a close ally of Abolghasem Kashani in the 1925 anti-republican campaign. He was elected to the fifteenth term by a Democrat Party ticket and as a supporter of Ahmad Qavam, but he crossed the floor and organized the protest against the government. Haerizadeh was a member of the National Front and supported Mohammad Mosaddegh, but left the front in 1952 turned against Mosadegh. He maintained close ties to the bazaari class.

References 

1894 births
1987 deaths
20th-century Iranian judges
Democrat Party of Iran politicians
National Front (Iran) MPs
Deputies of Tehran, Rey, Shemiranat and Eslamshahr
Iranian politicians who have crossed the floor
Members of the 4th Iranian Majlis
Members of the 5th Iranian Majlis
Members of the 6th Iranian Majlis
Members of the 15th Iranian Majlis
Members of the 16th Iranian Majlis
Members of the 17th Iranian Majlis
Members of the 18th Iranian Majlis